Dhu al-Himma Shalish (1951 – May 14, 2022) was the first cousin of Syrian President Bashar al-Assad and head of presidential security. He was part of Bashar al-Assad's inner circle.

Background
Dhu al-Himma Shalish was born in 1951, in the town of Qardaha in Latakia to an Alawi family. His mother was the sister of Hafez al-Assad. The Shalishs through Dhu al-Himma maintain a significant level of influence in the Syrian government and economy and are comparatively as influential as the Makhloufs who are the family of Hafez al-Assad’s wife.

Shalish owned SES International, which is active in the construction and automobile import sectors. He was also the brother of Riyad Shalish, who is the director of the government construction firm the Military Housing Establishment, which during the 1990s he managed to transform into his own company. He subsequently made a fortune on construction and contracting deals in Syria involving large-scale projects financed by other Arab states. It was also reported that the Shalishs had engaged in a number of illicit activities including smuggling and money laundering.

Iraqi activity
In June 2005, Dhu al-Himma and his nephew, Asef Isa Shalish, and their company, SES International Corporation, were sanctioned by the United States government for procuring defense-related goods for Saddam Hussein in violation of former sanctions against Iraq. According to the United States Treasury Department, SES helped the former Iraqi government access weapons systems by issuing false end-user certificates to foreign suppliers that listed Syria as the final country of destination. SES International then transshipped the goods to Iraq.

Prior to the war in Iraq, the Syrian government awarded Shalish's SES International exclusive rights on contracts to supply the Iraqi market with goods from construction materials to detergent. SES then sold the contracts to Syrian and foreign companies for a substantial profit. Dhu al-Himma Shalish is also reported to have received a significant amount of the $580 million USD in Iraqi assets that the Syrian government illegally paid out to Syrian claimants in 2003.

Dhu al-Himma Shalish and Assef Shawkat, Bashar al-Assad’s brother in law, prior to the Iraqi war also possibly helped the Iraqi government transport its weapons of mass destruction out of the country and into Syria for storage. The Syrian defector Nizar Nayuf reported that Iraq’s weapons of mass destruction were moved with the help of the Russians and Syrians to tunnels inside Syria.

Syrian civil war
Dhu al-Himma Shalish played an important role in containing the unrest during the Syrian civil war. On 24 June 2011, the European Union sanctioned him along with a number of other Syrian government officials for their role in the violent repression of protesters during the early stages of the civil war. His influence within the president's inner circle was believed to have increased since the beginning of the uprising. It was reported that he was a key financier and organiser of the pro-Assad militia groups known as the shabiha. Before the Syrian civil war, Shalish and his immediate family were poorly regarded by the Assads but they were reportedly elevated into the inner circle because they were willing to do the dirty work and because there were only so many family members.

References

1951 births
2022 deaths
Assad family
People from Latakia Governorate
People of the Syrian civil war